Ikaros Kallitheas B.C. (formerly Ikaros Chalkidas B.C.) is a professional basketball club that is based in Kallithea, Athens, Greece. The club has changed its home location several times. It was originally based in Nea Smyrni, and later moved to Kallithea, then moved for a while to Chalkida, and finally returned to Kallithea. Its full official name is Panathlitikos Omilos Kallitheas Ikaros, or P.O.K. Ikaros. The club's colors are white, blue, and red.

Logos

History
The club was founded in 1991, and was originally based in Nea Smyrni, Athens. In 2007, the club's home became Kallithea, Athens. In 2009, the club merged with Esperos Kallitheas, and played the 2009–10 season under the name of Ikaros Kallitheas-Esperos. In that same season, the club won the Greek 2nd Division championship. 

After winning the Greek 2nd Division in the 2009–10 season, the club broke away from its merger with Esperos Kallitheas, and once again took the name of Ikaros Kallitheas. They competed in the top league in Greece, the Greek Basket League, for the first time in the 2010–11 season. In 2013, the club moved to Chalkida. 

At the finish of the 2013–14 season, Ikaros Kallitheas was relegated to the Greek 2nd Division. But for the next season, the club declared that it was unable to take part in the A2 Division, and was then relegated to the Greek B Basket League. Simultaneously, the club returned to Kallithea. and was renamed again to Ikaros Kallitheas.

Arenas
When Ikaros has been based in Kallithea, they played their home games at the Esperos Indoor Hall, a small arena with a capacity of 1,000, and at Glyfada Makis Liougas Sportshall, an arena with a capacity of 3,500. During the time when the club was playing in Chalkida, they played their homes games at Chalkida Indoor Hall, an arena with a capacity of 1,620.

Titles and honors

Domestic competitions
Total Titles: 2
Greek 4th Division Champion: (2007)
Greek 2nd Division Champion: (2010)

Notable players

 Giannis Kalampokis
 Fanis Koumbouras
 Georgios Tsiaras
 Lazaros Agadakos
 Giannoulis Larentzakis
 Michalis Polytarchou
 Sotiris Manolopoulos
 Vassilis Toliopoulos
 Alexis Kyritsis
 Vassilis Symtsak
 Vangelis Karampoulas
 Ioannis Dimakos
 Mladen Pantić
 Saša Vasiljević
 Deon Thompson
 Julian Sensley
 Māris Ļaksa
 Mouhammad Faye
 Aron Baynes
 Romel Beck
/ Ivan Aska
 Pat Carroll
 Lance Harris
 Kyle McAlarney
 Michael Antonio "Mike" King
 Jimmy Baxter

Head coaches
 Aris Lykogiannis
 Dimitrios Priftis

References

External links
Official Website 
Eurobasket.com Team Page

Basketball teams in Greece
Basketball teams established in 1991
Nea Smyrni
Kallithea
Chalcis
1991 establishments in Greece